East Branch Reservoir, is a reservoir in the town of Southeast, New York, near the village of Brewster.  Part of the New York City water supply system, it was formed by impounding the East Branch of the Croton River.  Forming part of the Croton Watershed, it was placed into service in 1891, and lies some 35 miles (56 km) north of the city, in the southeast corner of  Putnam County.

History
It drains a 75-square mile (180 km²) area that includes Bog Brook Reservoir. Its water flows back into the East Branch of the Croton River south of the dam, then into The Diverting Reservoir, then via the Croton River to the Muscoot and the New Croton reservoirs, into the New Croton Aqueduct. Water from the aqueduct flows into the Jerome Park Reservoir in the Bronx for daily distribution.

One of two double reservoirs in NYC's system, it is connected to the Bog Brook impoundment via a 1,778-foot (547.07 m) tunnel. When the two were being built, the project's name was "Double Reservoir I". The second double reservoir project ("Double Reservoir II") would create the Croton Falls and Diverting reservoirs.

The village of Southeast Center, named for the town of Southeast, was leveled and flooded to create the reservoir. Parts of the village remain, including Sodom Road, at the foot of the Sodom Dam, which holds the reservoir back.

Construction of the reservoir also flooded part of the village of Milltown, in the northeastern corner of Southeast, near present-day Deforest Corners. Many of the village's original buildings were moved to higher ground, onto present-day Milltown Road, one of Southeast's longest roads running from New Fairfield, Connecticut, to Route 22 in Southeast. The village of Milltown's 1-room schoolhouse still stands today as a private residence. Foundations, rock walls and roadbeds for both villages can still be seen during droughts.

See also
List of reservoirs and dams in New York

References

External links 
 NYCDEP Water Supply Watersheds-Links to information on reservoirs by system
 

Croton Watershed
Reservoirs in New York (state)
Protected areas of Putnam County, New York
Reservoirs in Putnam County, New York
1891 establishments in New York (state)